The Table Rock Wilderness is a small pocket wilderness designated in 1984
in the western Cascade Mountains in northwestern Oregon, United States. Somewhat unusual for a wilderness in this area is that it is on BLM land rather the nearby Mount Hood National Forest.

Topography
The wilderness is in the densely forested and lower western Cascades, with the highest point being the namesake Table Rock
Table Rock offers interesting examples of columnar basalt.

Vegetation
The rugged Table Rock Wilderness is home to a forest of old-growth Douglas fir and western hemlock, with noble fir at higher elevations and crowds of rhododendron on many of the upper slopes.  By August huckleberry and salmonberry ripen on the slopes of Table and Rooster Rock. The rock slide on the north facing side of Table Rock is surrounded by a profusion of salmonberry.  At least two endangered plants bloom here – Sullivantia oregana and Gorman's aster.

Trails

There are four trailheads to the area.  The main trail, Table Rock Trail, is the same path used by Native Americans and was part of the larger cross-Cascades trail system.  Sites of archeological interest can be found here, including petroglyphs.
A moderately difficult hiking trail climbs  to the summit of Table Rock where the western Cascades can be viewed.  The panorama stretches from Mount Rainier in the north to Mount Shasta, a mere speck in the distance, in California.  The higher trails are snow-covered from November to May, though usually clear by Memorial Day.

Wildlife
The rock slide on the north facing side of Table Rock is well populated by a large colony of pikas, a small alpine herbivore.

See also
 List of Oregon Wildernesses
 List of U.S. Wilderness Areas
 Wilderness Act

References

External links

 

 Table Rock Wilderness Area - BLM page

Wilderness areas of Oregon
Bureau of Land Management wilderness areas in Oregon
Protected areas of Clackamas County, Oregon
IUCN Category Ib
1984 establishments in Oregon
Protected areas established in 1984